Argyle County was one of the original Nineteen Counties in New South Wales and is now one of the 141 Cadastral divisions of New South Wales. It includes the area around Goulburn. It is bounded by Lake George in the south-west, the Shoalhaven River in the east, and the Wollondilly River in the north-east.

Argyle County was named by Governor Macquarie after his native county in Scotland. He named it while inspecting the area in 1820.

In 1829 the Act for Instituting and regulating Courts of General and Quarter Sessions in New South Wales established courts in the county at Cookbundoon, Goulburn Plains and Inverary. James Byrne was Assistant Surveyor for the County in 1832. In 1835 Argyle had a magistrate and police force.

It was also described as having productive land and inexhaustible water.

In 1857, Charles Cowper was a major landowner in the area, and held  in the county. The Electoral district of Argyle was the former state electoral district for the area between 1856 and 1904. The Encyclopædia Britannica Eleventh Edition mentions Goulburn as being in the county.

The Greater Argyle Council was formed in 2004 after a proposal to make a new local government area to focus on the County of Argyle, formed from an amalgamation of the former City of Goulburn and parts of Mulwaree Shire. It was renamed the Goulburn Mulwaree Council in October 2004.

Parishes within this county
A full list of parishes found within this county; their current LGA and mapping coordinates to the approximate centre of each location is as follows:

References

External links
1840s map of Argyle County at the National Library
Argylecounty.com.au

Counties of New South Wales